

Annual Sales (USD Millions)

Notes

Drug-related lists
Pharmaceutical industry